or  is a lake that lies in the municipality of Grane in Nordland county, Norway.  The  lake lies in the southeastern part of Lomsdal–Visten National Park, just north of Norwegian National Road 73.

See also
 List of lakes in Norway
 Geography of Norway

References

Lakes of Nordland
Grane, Nordland